Vít Fousek can refer to:

 Vít Fousek Sr. (1913–1990), Czech cross-country skier
 Vít Fousek Jr. (born 1940), Czech cross-country skier